Marele Day (born 4 May 1947) is an Australian author of mystery novels. She won the Shamus Award for her first Claudia Valentine novel and a Ned Kelly Award for non-fiction work How to Write Crime.

Biography
Day was born in Sydney, and grew up in Pagewood, an industrial suburb. She attended Sydney Girls High School and Sydney Teachers' College and in 1973 obtained a degree from Sydney University. She has worked as a patent searcher and as a researcher and has also taught in elementary school during the 1980s.

Her Claudia Valentine series features a feminist Sydney-based private investigator but her breakthrough novel was Lambs of God which was a departure from the crime genre and features two nuns battling to save the island on which they live from developers; it became a bestseller. Lambs of God was adapted into a tv series of the same name in 2019, starring Ann Dowd and Essie Davis.

She lives on the New South Wales North coast, where she is on the board of Byron Writers Festival and was the mentor of their residential mentorship program from 2002-2022.

Bibliography

Claudia Valentine series
 The Life and Crimes of Harry Lavender (1988) - Shamus Award winner
 The Case of the Chinese Boxes (1990)
 The Last Tango of Dolores Delgado (1993)
 The Disappearances of Madalena Grimaldi (1995)

Other novels
 Shirley's Song (1984)
 Lambs of God (1997)
 Mavis Levack, P.I. (2000)
 Mrs Cook: The Real and Imagined Life of the Captain's Wife (2003)
 The Sea Bed (2009)

Non-fiction
 Successful Promotion by Writers (1993)
 How to Write Crime (1996) - Ned Kelly Award winner

References

External links
Marele Day: an interview with the author of Lambs of God
Podcast with Marele Day

1947 births
Writers from Sydney
Australian women writers
University of Sydney alumni
Living people
Ned Kelly Award winners
Shamus Award winners
Australian mystery writers
Women mystery writers
People educated at Sydney Girls High School